Qımırlı (also, Kymyrly) is a village in the Qakh Rayon of Azerbaijan. The village forms part of the municipality of Xələftala.

References 

Populated places in Qakh District